Anhalt Arena is an indoor sporting arena located in Dessau, Germany.  The capacity of the arena is 3,200 people.  It is currently the home of the Dessau-Roßlauer HV 2006.

Indoor arenas in Germany
Dessau
Sports venues in Saxony-Anhalt
Buildings and structures in Dessau-Roßlau